Tekle Giyorgis may refer to
Tekle Giyorgis I (c. 1751–1817), Emperor of Ethiopia 
Tekle Giyorgis II (died 1873), Emperor of Ethiopia